Modulated continuous wave (MCW) is Morse code telegraphy, transmitted using an audio tone to modulate a carrier wave.

The Federal Communications Commission defines modulated continuous wave in 47 CFR §97.3(c)(4) as "Tone-modulated international Morse code telegraphy emissions having designators with A, C, D, F, G, H or R as the first symbol; 2 as the second symbol; A or B as the third symbol." See Types of radio emissions for a general explanation of these symbols.

Types of Morse code radio transmissions (CW and MCW) discussed in this article include:
 A1A and A2A — Double-sideband amplitude modulation (AM); One channel containing digital information, no subcarrier (A1A) or using a subcarrier (A2A); Aural telegraphy (intended to be decoded by ear)
 F2A — Frequency modulation (FM); One channel containing digital information, using a subcarrier; Aural telegraphy
 J2A and J2B — Single-sideband with suppressed carrier; One channel containing digital information, using a subcarrier; Aural telegraphy (J2A) or Electronic telegraphy (intended to be decoded by machine) (J2B)

Unlike A1A CW transmissions, A2A MCW will produce an audible audio tone from an AM radio receiver that is not equipped with a beat oscillator. MCW is commonly used by RDF beacons to transmit the station identifier.

F2A MCW Morse can be heard on a normal FM radio receiver, and it is commonly used by both commercial and amateur repeater stations for identification.  Also, F2A is sometimes used by other types of stations operating under automatic control, such as a telemetry transmitter or a remote base station.

MCW can be generated by any AM or FM radio transmitter with audio input from an audio oscillator or equivalent audio source. When an SSB transmitter is modulated by Morse code of only a single audio frequency, the resulting radio frequency emission is J2A or J2B and therefore is CW by definition, not MCW.

Within the United States, MCW transmission is not permitted to amateur radio operators in spectrum that is restricted to CW emission types only or CW, RTTY and data emission types only, or in the 60 meter band.

See also 
 Morse code
 Prosigns for Morse code
 Types of radio emissions

References 

 
 

Morse code
Radio modulation modes